Colegio México Bachillerato, A.C.  is a secondary school, with junior high school (secundaria) and senior high school (preparatoria or bachillerato) classes.

References

External links
 Colegio Mexico Bachillerato, A.C. 

High schools in Mexico City